The Pale-faced bare-eye (Phlegopsis borbae), sometimes known as the pale-faced antbird, is a species of bird in the family Thamnophilidae. It has often been placed in the monotypic genus Skutchia, but based on genetic evidence this genus is now merged with Phlegopsis, and this treatment was adopted by the SACC in 2010. It is endemic to humid forest in the south-central Amazon in Brazil. It is an obligate ant-follower only rarely seen away from ant swarms.

References

Further reading

pale-faced bare-eye
Birds of the Brazilian Amazon
Endemic birds of Brazil
pale-faced bare-eye
Taxonomy articles created by Polbot